We Have Sound is the first studio album by the rock artist Tom Vek. It was released on 4 April 2005 in the UK, and 25 October 2005 in the US.

Track listing
All tracks written Tom Vek

Charts

Release history

References

External links

 

2005 debut albums
Tom Vek albums
Startime International albums